This is a list of law schools in Israel.

Law schools in Israel
There are four faculties of law at these Israeli universities:
Bar Ilan University (BIU), Yaakov Herzog Faculty of Law, Ramat Gan
University of Haifa (HAI), Faculty of Law, Haifa
Hebrew University of Jerusalem (HUJI), Faculty of Law, Mount Scopus Campus, Jerusalem
Tel Aviv University (TAU), Faculty of Law, Tel Aviv

In addition, there are nine schools of law at these Israeli colleges:
The College of Law and Business , Ramat Gan
College of Management , Rishon Lezion
Netanya Academic College , Netanya
Ono Academic College, Kiryat Ono
The Academic Center for Law and Science, Hod HaSharon
Zefat Academic College, Zefat
Sapir Academic College, Sderot
Peres Academic College, Rehovot
Interdisciplinary Center (IDC) , Herzliya

Number of licensing graduates
According to the Israel Bar, the 1,817 new lawyers who were awarded license on 14.6.07 were trained at the following schools:

See also
Education in Israel
Law Schools by Country
List of universities and colleges in Israel

References

Israel
Law schools
2
Colleges in Israel
law schools